The Bishop of Hereford is the ordinary of the Church of England Diocese of Hereford in the Province of Canterbury.

The episcopal see is centred in the City of Hereford where the bishop's seat (cathedra) is in the Cathedral Church of Saint Mary and Saint Ethelbert. The diocese was founded for the minor sub-kingdom of the Magonsæte in 676. It now covers the whole of the county of Herefordshire, southern Shropshire and a few parishes in Worcestershire, Powys and Monmouthshire. The arms of the see are gules, three leopard's faces reversed jessant-de-lys or, which were the personal arms of Bishop Thomas de Cantilupe (d.1282).

Until 1534 the Diocese of Hereford was in full communion with the Roman Catholic Church and two of its bishops were canonised. During the English Reformation the bishops of England and Wales conformed to the independent Church of England under Henry VIII and Edward VI, but, under Mary I, they adhered to the Roman Catholic Church. Since the accession of Elizabeth I the diocese has again been part of the Church of England and Anglican Communion.

The current bishop is Richard Jackson. The bishop's residence is The Palace, Hereford.

List of bishops 
Note: The chronology prior to 1056 is partly conjectural.

Anglo-Saxon bishops

Norman conquest to the Reformation

Bishops during the Reformation

Post-Reformation bishops

Assistant bishops
Among those who have served as assistant bishops of the diocese were:
19421947 (res.): Alfred Smith, Vicar of Ford, Shropshire and former Assistant Bishop of Lagos
19471963 (ret.): Edmund Sara, Rector of Ludlow and former Coadjutor Bishop of Jamaica and Assistant Bishop of Bath and Wells
1963–1975 (ret.): Arthur Partridge, Vicar of Ludford (until 1969) and former Bishop in Nandyal

Arms of Bishops of Hereford

Knowledge of the coats of arms of Bishops of Hereford is necessary for the identification of the patrons or instigators of building works, manuscripts, stained glass windows and other art-works, which frequently bear heraldic imagery with no further identifying marks.
The following list of the blazons of the arms of the Bishops of Hereford (with his sources) was compiled by Rev. Francis T. Havergal (Vicar-Choral and Sub-Treasurer of Hereford Cathedral) in his Fasti Herefordenses of 1869; all arms before the start of the age of heraldry (c.1200-1215) are attributed arms, some, like de Vere, being the arms later adopted by his family:
29th Bishop, Gerard, 1096–1100. Gules, on a saltier Arg., another humette of the field; in chief a mitre coroneted, stringed Or. MS. Rawlinson, 158 Bodleian. (attributed arms)
33. Robert de Betun, 1131–48. Arg. two pallets Sable, each charged with three crosslets fitchy Or. (attributed arms). Arms of De Betton of Salop.
34. Gilbert Foliott, 1148–63. Barry of six Arg. and Gules, a bend S. Heralds' College. (attributed arms)
36. Robert Foliott, 1174–86. Gules a bend Argent. MS. Brit. Mus. Add. 12,443. (attributed arms). Also a modern shield over his effigy in south choir aisle.
37. William de Vere, 1186–99. Quarterly, Gules and Or, in 1st quarter a mullet Argent. Harley MS 4056. (attributed arms). Also a modern coloured shield on his tomb in the cathedral.
38. Giles de Braose or Bruce, 1200–16. Az., three bars vaire, ermine and Gules. British Library Harley MS 2275 & Add MS 12443.
40. Hugh Folliott, 1219–34. Arg. a lion rampant double queued Purpure, crowned Or. Harley MS 5814.
41. Ralph de Maidstone, 1234–39. Arg. a lion rampant, Az. crowned with a coronet of four balls Or. British Library Add MS 12443.
43. John le Breton, 1269–75. Quarterly, per fess indented, Gu. and Arg., in first quarter a mullet Sable.
44. Thomas de Cantilupe, 1275–82. Gu. three leopards' faces reversed, jessant de lys Or. Planche's Pursuivant of Arms.
46. Adam de Orleton, 1317–27. Three hogsheads, two and one. Gent. Magazine, viii. 238. The colour of the field is not known; the tuns were probably proper.
47. Thomas Charleton or Cherlton, 1327–44. Or, a lion rampant Gules. His official seal, but British Library Add MS 12443 adds the mitre on shoulder. Formerly painted in several windows of the cathedral.
48. John Trilleck, 1344–60. Arg. three bends Az. on a chief Gules, three fleur-de-lys Arg. Authority for colours from Mr. Henry Beddoe.
49. Lewis de Charleton, 1361–69. Or, a lion rampant Gules. This is the only remaining shield on his tomb, also on the White Cross. Rawlinson describes another shield as given by Bedford, which is now lost – Seme de cross crosslets fitche, a lion rampant Gules. Bedford gives no colours. The second and third quarters should be coloured as above.
50. William Courtenay, 1374–75. Or, three torteaux; on a label Az. three mitres of the field. MSS. Lambeth, 555.
52. John Trevenant, 1389–1404. Or, within a bordure engrailed Az. three lions' heads erased, Gules. This shield, formerly beneath his effigy in the South Transept, has been placed in error under the effigy of Dean Harvey in the S.E. Transept.
53. Robert Mascall, 1404–16. Sab. three mitres Argent (Or, according to Bedford). Heralds' College.
54. Edmund Lacy, 1417–20. Arg. three shovellers' heads erased, Or. Monument in Exeter Cathedral.
55. Thomas Polton, 1420–22. Arg. three mullets of six points, pierced, Sable.
56. Thomas Spofford, 1422–48. Az., two pastoral staves in saltier, and a mitre in chief, Or. Window in Ludlow Church, and stone vaulting of South Transept of the cathedral.
57. Richard Beauchamp, 1449–50. Gu. a fess between six martlets Or; a bordure Arg. entoyre of six bells Sable. Other authorities give his shield quarterly. Monument at Salisbury; Lansdowne MS. 874.
58. Reginald Boulers or Butler, 1451–53. Or, a chief dancette Az.
59. John Stanbery, 1453–74. Az. two chevronels engrailed between three mullets pierced Arg. Tomb and chantry in the cathedral.
60. Thomas Milling, 1474–92. Ermine, on a saltier engrailed Purpure five martlets Or. Ashm. MS. 8569.
61. Edmund Audley, 1492–1502. Quarterly first and fourth Gules, a fret Or; second and third Ermine a chevron Gu. MS. College of Arms. Roof of Lincoln College Chapel, Oxford. Screen of Chantry and glass in upper windows, Hereford Cathedral.
62. Adrian de Castello, 1502–4. Argent, three bendlets crenelle, Sa. Roof of Bath Abbey. Coles' MS. Addl. 5798.
63. Richard Mayo, 1504–16. Arg. on a fess Sa. between three roses Gu., a lily of the first. On his monument, and Audley Screen in Hereford Cathedral.
64. Charles Booth, 1516–35. Arg. three boars' heads erased erect Sa., a rose in fess point. Monument in the cathedral.
65. Edward Fox, 1535–38. Quarterly 1st and 4th Arg. on a bend Gu. three dolphins . embowed Or. 2d and 3d Or a chevron between three foxes' heads erased Gu. Coles' MS. Addl. 5802.
66. John Skipp, 1539–52. Az. on a chevron between three estoiles Or, two roses stalked and slipped proper. Coles' MS. Addl. 5798.
67. John Harley, 1553–54. Or, on a bend cotised Sa. a fleur-de- lys of the field, a bon dure engrailed Gules. Harley MS 1359.
68. Robert Parfew or Wharton, 1554–57. Gules, two arms and hands clasped in fess proper, between three hearts, Or. MS. Parl. Roll of Edward VI. A.D. 1553.
69. John Scory, 1559–85. Or, three pelicans' heads erased Sable, on a chief Az., a fleur-de-lys between two mullets of the first. Plate in Parker's Antiquities MSS. Brit. Mus. Addl. 12,443 [now British Library Add MS 12443], gives it otherwise, on a chevron five cinquefoils. I have a MS. which states that "this bishop was descended from an ancient family, but being ignorant of his descent, he had assigned him for Arms, per chevron embattled Or and Sable, three pelicans' heads counterchanged, on a chief Az. a fleur-de-lys between two estoiles of the first. His own, which his family retook and bore, were Or, on a saltire Sable, 5 cinquefoils of the first". Duncumb gives, chevron crenelle between three pelicans' heads erased.
70. Herbert Westfaling, 1586–1602. The arms granted to this Bishop, Eliz. 24, were; Az. a cross between four caltrops Or. Formerly on his monument. Harley MS 4056.
71. Robert Bennett, 1603-I 7. Quarterly 1st and 4th Argent a cross between four demilions rampant Gu., 2d and 3d, paly of six, Arg. and Vert. (Arms of Langley.) On his monument in the cathedral. Harley MS 4056.
72. Francis Godwin, 1617–33. Or, two lioncels passant Gu. on a canton S. three plates or bezants. Glass in window of Bodleian Library.
74. Matthew Wren, 1635. Arg. a chevron between three lions' heads erased, Gu. on a chief sable three crosslets of the first. A MS. of my own gives the lions' heads Sable. Blomefield's Norfolk.
75. Theophilus Field, 1636. Sable, a chevron between three garbs Or. Rawlinson, 2 x 7. Formerly on his monument.
76. George Coke, 1636–46. Gules, three crescents and a canton Or. Formerly on his tomb, but the shield is now on the west wall of N.E. Transept.
77. Nicholas Monk, 1661. Gules, on a chevron between three lions' heads, erased Arg., a mullet pierced for difference. MS. Ashmole, 8585.
78. Herbert Croft, 1662–91. Quarterly per fess indented Az. and Arg. in first quarter a lion passant guardant, Or. MS. College of Arms. Tombstone in Cathedral.
79. Gilbert Ironside, 1691–1701. Quarterly Arg. and Gules, a cross flore Or. Tombstone in Cathedral.
80. Humfrey Humphries, 1701–12. Quarterly, first, Gules, a lion rampant Arg.; second, three eagles displayed in fess; third, three lions passant; fourth, three children's heads couped at the neck with a serpent proper. Rawlinson's Hereford. Tombstone in the cathedral.
81. Philip Bisse, 1712–21. Sable, three escalops in pale Argent. Duncumb's History. I am informed that since 1848 these arms were in the hall of the Palace with the field Gules.
82. Benjamin Hoadly, 1721–24. Quarterly Az. and Or, in first quarter a pelican in piety Argent. Confirmation by Deputy Earl Marshal, 1716.
83. Henry Egerton, 1724–46. Argent, a lion rampant Gules between three pheons and a mullet Sable. Richardson's Godwin. Official seal.
84. Lord James Beauclerk, 1746–87. Quarterly first and fourth. France and England quarterly. 2. Scotland. 3. Ireland. Over all a sinister baton Gules, charged with three roses Arg., barbed and seeded Vert. Porny's Heraldry, 1787. On carved oak now in N.E. Transept, formerly in the Choir.
85. John Harley, 1787–88. Or, on a bend cotised Sable, a crescent for difference. Described thus by Bedford. His official seal bears quarterly first and fourth Or, a bend cotised Sable, second and third two lions in pale passant guardant; no crescent.
86. John Butler, 1788–1802. Gules, a bend between three covered cups Or. Official seal.
87. Folliott Cornewall, 1803–8. Quarterly first and fourth Argent, a lion rampant Gu., ducally crowned Or within a bordure Az. bezante; two party per pale Az. and Gules, three lions rampant Or; three Gu. a cross raguly between four lions' heads erected and erased ducally crowned Or. Official seal.
88. John Luxmoore, 1808–15. Argent, a chevron between three moorcocks proper. Official seal.
89. George Huntingford, 1815–32. Per fess Sa. and erminois, a fess per fess nebulee counterchanged, in chief three crosses patee fitchee, Argent, the base fretty Gu. College of Arms. Memorial window in Hereford Cathedral. 
90. Hon. Edward Grey, 1832–37. Gules, a lion rampant in a bordure engrailed Argent. Official and private seal.
91. Thomas Musgrave, 1837–47. Azure, six annulets in pile, Argent. Official seal.
92. Renn Dickson Hampden, 1847–68. Argent, four wands interlaced in saltier, between four eagles displayed, Azure. Official seal.
93. James Atlay, 1868. Argent, a fess Sable between three crescents Sable. Official sea1.

Notes

References

 
 
 
 
 
 

Hereford
 
Herefordshire-related lists